Zeta Arae (ζ Ara, ζ Arae) is the third-brightest star in the southern constellation Ara. The apparent visual magnitude of this star is 3.1, which can be seen from suburban skies in the southern hemisphere.

The spectrum of this star matches a stellar classification of K3 III. The luminosity class of 'III' indicates this is a giant star that has exhausted the hydrogen at its core and evolved away from the main sequence. It is radiating energy from its outer atmosphere at an effective temperature of 4,246 K which is what gives it the orange hue of a K-type star. This star displays an excess of infrared emission that may indicate circumstellar matter.

Allen called it Tseen Yin , together with δ Arae, from the Chinese 天陰 (Mandarin pronunciation tiānyīn) "dark sky". However, 天陰 is in Aries. so Allen probably confused constellation "Ara" with "Ari".

References

External links
 HR 6285
 Image Zeta Arae

Guī wǔ
152786
Arae, Zeta
Ara (constellation)
K-type giants
083081
6285
Durchmusterung objects
9581